Adrian Radley (born 22 April 1976) is a retired Australian swimmer specializing in the backstroke events. He is best known for winning a gold and bronze medal in the men's 100 m backstroke and the men's  medley relay at the 1997 FINA Short Course World Championships in Gothenburg, Sweden.

The medley relay consisted of a young team of Adrian Radley, Philip Rogers, Geoff Huegill and Michael Klim. It was the first time the Australians had set a world record in a relay event in over 30 years, beating the US team to Silver at the Championships and signaled the start of the men's teams resurgence as one of the world’s best relay teams.

Adrian continued to win the sport throughout 1998 having continued success at the 1998 Kuala Lumpur Commonwealth Games which saw him win a gold and silver medal. The same year saw Adrian rewrite the record books as a dual Commonwealth Record Holder in the 100m and 200m backstroke.

His success continued abroad winning the 1997 and 1998 World Cup and was named best male backstroker. He also competed for his native, and only country at the 1998 World Aquatics Championships and the 1998 Commonwealth Games in Kuala Lumpur where he won a gold medal as a part of the men's  medley relay and an individual silver medal in the men's 200 m backstroke again in World Record time. This was the first time the USA had been beaten in the men's Medley Relay at a World Championship.

Despite swimming more than  a week, Radley completed a double bachelor's degree in commerce with majors in Strategy, Marketing and Accounting and now works for multinational professional services firm KPMG as a Director in their Enterprise practice.

Adrian lives with his partner, Belinda, and his two daughters Sienna (2010) and Charlotte (2011) in Perth, Western Australia.

See also
 List of Commonwealth Games medalists in swimming (men)

References

External links 
 
 

1976 births
Living people
Australian male backstroke swimmers
World record setters in swimming
Medalists at the FINA World Swimming Championships (25 m)
Commonwealth Games medallists in swimming
Commonwealth Games gold medallists for Australia
Commonwealth Games silver medallists for Australia
Swimmers at the 1998 Commonwealth Games
Medallists at the 1998 Commonwealth Games